La Opinión  (Spanish: "The Opinion") is frequently used as a newspaper name in the Spanish-speaking world and in other countries. A partial list includes:

Argentina
La Opinión (Argentina) – Buenos Aires, Argentina, edited by Jacobo Timerman (1971 to 1977)
La Opinion Austral - Río Gallegos, Santa Cruz, Argentina

Colombia
La Opinión (Cúcuta) – Cúcuta, Norte de Santander

Mexico
La Opinión (Poza Rica) – Poza Rica, Veracruz
La Opinión (Puebla) – Puebla, Puebla

Puerto Rico
La Opinión (Cayey) – Cayey
La Opinión del Sur – Ponce

Spain
La Opinión A Coruña – A Coruña
La Opinión de Almeria – Almería
La Opinión de Málaga – Málaga 
La Opinión de Murcia – Murcia 
La Opinión de Tenerife – Santa Cruz de Tenerife 
La Opinión - El Correo de Zamora – Zamora

United States
La Opinión (California) – Los Angeles, California